Vijayadasami is a 2007 Indian Telugu-language action film directed by V. Samudra and produced by Edara Rangarao. A remake of the 2005 Tamil film Sivakasi, it stars Kalyan Ram Nandamuri, Vedhika and Sai Kumar. Vedhika made her Telugu cinema debut with this film, while Srikanth Deva also composed the music for Sivakasi that was reused in this film.

The film was released on 21 September 2007, receiving negative reviews from critics. It was a commercial failure, and Kalyan Ram himself was not satisfied with the film's execution by Samudra. The film had an international DVD release on 25 April 2008. During a Facebook live session in 2018, Kalyan Ram said he regretted doing this film because he was not confident about it but had to take it in spite of demanding changes that weren't made.

Synopsis 
 
The film follows Sivakasi, a welder and is in love with a girl called Devi. later, he is forced to reveal his tragic past to his girlfriend after being attacked by her suspecting brothers. He now must confront his brother Durga Prasad who ruined his life years ago as a child.

Cast
Kalyan Ram as Sivakasi/Shakthi
Vedhika as Devi
Sai Kumar as Durga Prasad
Suman as Chennamaneni Rajeswara Rao
Paruchuri Venkateswara Rao as Hanumanth Rao
Jayasudha as Mahalakshmi
Brahmanandam as Sivakasi's friend
Srinivasa Reddy as Shankthi's friend
Duvvasi Mohan as Sivakasi's friend
AVS as Vinayaka Rao
Allari Subhashini as Sub-inspector of police
Rajan P. Dev
Pavala Syamala
Simran as herself in the song "Cine Tara"

Production 
The story was written by Perarasu who also wrote and directed the original film, while the Paruchuri brothers wrote the dialogues. Ram Prasad handled the cinematography, while Nandamuri Hari edited the film and Stun Siva choreographed the action sequences. Kalyan Ram decided to star in the film after watching the Tamil original in Vizag. The film was shot at a specially erected street set in Ramanaidu Cine Village, Hyderabad. The climax scenes were shot for a week at Ramoji Film City.

Soundtrack
The music was composed by Srikanth Deva and released by Aditya Music. All of the songs were reused from Sivakasi.

Release
The film had a low-key release and earned mixed reviews, with a critic from Indiaglitz.com stating "it appeared to be a routine commercial film with mass elements sans any masala". Another critic from FullHyderabad.com called the film "archaic" and stated "stay away from this one – else, it will stay with you for a long while". Likewise, a reviewer from Rediff.com stated the film "offers nothing new".

References

External links

2007 films
2000s Telugu-language films
2007 action films
Indian action films
Telugu remakes of Tamil films
2000s masala films
Films scored by Srikanth Deva
Films directed by V. Samudra